Nýhil was an Icelandic avant-garde small press and association of young writers, founded around 2002-2004 by Eiríkur Örn Norðdahl and Haukur Már Helgason, followed shortly by Grímur Hákonarson, and ceasing operation around 2011.

History
The group's 'most active years were between 2004 and 2009'. The group was noted for its social criticism and international outlook, publishing over 50 volumes, and bringing over 40 writers from abroad to its poetry festivals. For a period beginning in spring 2006 the group ran a poetry bookshop in the premises of Bad Taste Records on Laugavegur. The group has also been identified as one of the sources of left-wing critical thinking that underpinned Iceland's 2009 'Pots and pans revolution'.

The group also ran an international poetry festival, whose seventh iteration took place in the Norræna húsið in autumn 2010.

The collective drew to a close as its main members emerged into the Icelandic literary mainstream. Prominent Icelandic authors who have published extensively with Nýhil include Eiríkur Örn Norðdahl and Óttar M. Norðfjörð. However, its members were linked with a series of 'radical summerschools' which began in 2009 (Nýhil published the summerschool's first proceedings in that year as Af marxisma), and the summerschools have continued.

Publications
Here follows a complete list of publications named as being by Nýhil in the Icelandic national library catalogue Gegnir.

Novels 
 Örvitinn eða hugsjónamaðurinn. Óttar Martin Norðfjörð (text); Inga Birgisdóttir teiknaði (pictures). Reykjavík: Nýhil, 2010
 Konur. Steinar Bragi. Reykjavík: Nýhil, 2008
 Eitur fyrir byrjendur. Eiríkur Örn Norðdahl. Reykjavík: Nýhil, 2006

Essays/non-fiction/biography 
 Íslensk menningarpólitík. Bjarki Valtýsson. Reykjavík: Nýhil, 2011
 Arkitektinn með alpahúfuna: ævisaga Sverris Norðfjörð. Óttar M. Norðfjörð. Reykjavík: Nýhil, 2009
 Af marxisma. ed. by Magnús Þór Snæbjörnsson and Viðar Þorsteinsson. Reykjavík: Nýhil, 2009
 Íslam með afslætti. ed. by Auður Jónsdóttir & Óttar Martin Norðfjörð. Reykjavík: Nýhil, 2008
 Gissurson: hver er orginal?. Óttar Martin Norðfjörð. Reykjavík: Nýhil, 2008
 Hólmsteinn: holaðu mig, dropi, holaðu mig: 2. bindi í ævisögu Hannesar Hólmsteins Gissurarsonar. Óttar M. Norðfjörð. Reykjavík: Nýhil, 2007
 Hannes: nóttin er blá, mamma. Óttar Martin Norðfjörð. Reykjavík: Nýhil, 2006
 Af ljóðum. Ed. by Eiríkur Örn Norðdahl. Reykjavík: Nýhil, 2005

Norrænar bókmenntir 
In 2006, Nýhil made a deal with Landsbankinn that the bank would pay for 130 copies of the nine books in the Nýhil series Norrænar bókmenntir to be distributed to libraries throughout Iceland. They were:

Other poetry and experimental writing
 Gengismunur: ljóð úr skýrslu rannsóknarnefndar alþingis. Jón Örn Loðmfjörð. Reykjavík: Nýhil, 2010
 Gjá. Haukur Már Helgason, ed. by Kári Páll Óskarsson. Reykjavík: Nýhil, 2010
 Grimm ævintýri. Ásgeir H. Ingólfsson (text); Gunnlaugur Starri Gylfason (pictures). Reykjavík: Nýhil, 2010
 Endalok: úrval ljóða. Trausti Breiðfjörð Magnússon. Reykjavík: Nýhil, 2010
 Sjálf kvíslast ég. Hildur Lilliendahl. Reykjavík: Nýhil, 2009
 Af steypu. ed. by Eiríkur Örn Norðdal and Kári Páll Óskarsson. Reykjavík: Nýhil, 2009
 FALN 2009: 5ta alþjóðlega ljóðahátíð Nýhil 2009 = Nýhíl international poetry festival V 2009 NIPF. Reykjavík: Nýhil, 2009
 Ég hata alla!: ... da ra ra raaa. Bryndís Björgvinsdóttir. Reykjavík: Nýhil, 2009
 Högg á vatni. Hermann Stefánsson. Reykjavík: Nýhil, 2009
 Sori: manifestó. Valerie Solanas, trans. by Dr. Usli. Reykjavík: Nýhil, 2009
 Úr skilvindu drauma. Arngrímur Vídalín. Reykjavík: Nýhil, 2009
 Það sem mér finnst helst að heiminum.... Ingólfur Gíslason. Reykjavík: Nýhil, 2009
 Usli: kennslubók. Dr. Usli. Reykjavík: Nýhil, 2009
 Með villidýrum. Kári Páll Óskarsson. Reykjavík: Nýhil, 2008
 Fréttir frá mínu landi: óspakmæli og örsögur. Ármann Jakobsson. Reykjavík: Nýhil, 2008
 Tvítólaveizlan. Ófeigur Sigurðsson. Reykjavik: Nýhil, 2008
 Gáttir: þýðingarit 4ðu alþjóðlegu ljóðahátíðar Nýhils = Gateways: translation of the 4th intl. Nýhil poetry festival: Reykjavík 22.-24. ágúst 2008. ritstjóri = editor Kári Páll Óskarsson. Reykjavík: Nýhil, 2008
 Síðasta ljóðabók Sjóns. Celidonius. Reykjavík: Nýhil, 2008
 Þess á milli. Ingvar Högni Ragnarsson. Reykjavík: Nýhil, 2008
 3ja alþjóðlega ljóðahátíð Nýhils: Reykjavík 12.-14. október 2007: Þjóðleikhúskjallaranum og Norræna húsinu. Reykjavík: Nýhil, 2007
 Þjónn, það er Fönix í öskubakkanum mínum!: ljóðasafn. Eiríkur Örn Norðdahl. Reykjavík: Nýhil, 2007
 Biblía gáfaða fólksins. Gils N. Eggerz. Reykjavík: Nýhil, 2007
 Sekúndu nær dauðanum: vá, tíminn líður!. Ingólfur Gíslason. Reykjavík: Nýhil, 2007
 Handsprengja í morgunsárið: baráttukvæði. Ingólfur Gíslason & Eiríkur Örn Norðdahl. Reykjavík: Nýhil, 2007
 Fenrisúlfur. Bjarni Klemenz. Reykjavík: Nýhil, 2006
 Barkakýli úr tré: ljóðabók. Þorsteinn Guðmundsson. Reykjavík: Nýhil, 2006
 Storie S: schemes. Th,. J.B. (texts); Th., J.B. (translation); J.B. (pictures). Reykjavík: Nýhil, 2006
 Svavar Pétur & 20. öldin. Haukur Már Helgason. Reykjavík: Nýhil, 2006
 AÁBCDÐEÉFG .... Aórtt M. Ððfjnorrö. Reykjavík: Nýhil, 2006
 Úfin, strokin. Örvar der Alte. Reykjavík: Nýhil, 2005
 Ást æða varps. Ófeigur Sigurðsson and others, ed. by Haukur Már Helgason & Ófeigur Sigurðsson. Reykjavík: Nýhil, 2005
 Sirkus. Óttar Martin. Reykjavík: Nýhil, 2005
 Ofurmennisþrá: milli punkts og stjarna. Valur Brynjar Antonsson. Reykjavík: Nýhil, 2004
 Grillveður í október. Óttarr m. Reykjavík: Nýhil, 2004
 Af okkur. ed. by Viðar Þorsteinsson. Reykjavík: Nýhil, 2004
 Á íslensku má alltaf finna Ginsberg [audiobook]. Allen Ginsberg, trans. and read by Eiríkur Örn Norddahl, with music by Gísli Magnússon. Reykjavík: Nýhil, 2003
 Handlöngun. Ófeigur Sigurðsson. Reykjavík: Nýhil, 2003
 Spegilmynd Púpunnar: greatests shits. Hallvarður Ásgeirsson. Reykjavík: Nýhil, 2003
 2004. Haukur Már Helgason. Reykjavík: Nýhil, 2003
 Af stríði. ed. by Haukur Már Helgason. Reykjavík: Nýhil, 2003
 Nihil obstat. Eiríkur Örn Norðdahl. Reykjavík: Nýhil, 2003
 Heimsendapestir. Eiríkur Örn Norðdahl. Reykjavík: Nýhil, 2002

External links
 Website (2007)
 Publications at Reykjavík UNESCO city of literature
 Radical summerschool website

Further reading
 Hjalti Snær Ægisson. “Um ljóðabækur ungskálda frá árinu 2004. Nokkrar glæfralegar athugasemdir,” Són (2005): 141–59.
 Viðar Þorsteinsson. “Nýhil, eða vandi hins nýja,” Skírnir (spring 2006): 207–11.
 Hermann Stefánsson. “Eitthvað nýtt!” Lesbók Morgunblaðsins (9 June 2007): 10.
 Benedikt Hjartarson. “Af þrálátum dauða og upprisum framúrstefnunnar: Ótímabærar hugleiðingar um hefðarvitund og nýsköpun,” Són: Tímarit um óðfræði 8 (2010): 173–207.
 Bjarni Bjarnason. Boðskort í þjóðarveislu. N.p.: Uppheimar, 2009. pp. 172-95.

References

Icelandic literature
Literary publishing companies